William Neil Charman is an Australian pharmaceutical scientist and pharmacist whose work has developed medical treatments in a range of areas, including a new drug for the treatment of malaria. He was also the founder and director of biomedical sciences company Acrux Ltd. He has published more than 320 scientific papers on his research and has received tens of millions of dollars in funding to further his work. Prior to embarking on a career in academic research, he worked for a number of pharmaceutical companies in the USA.

He has received numerous international awards for his work, including the Glaxo Wellcome International Achievement award in Pharmaceutical Sciences from the Royal Pharmaceutical Society of Great Britain in 1999, the Drug Discovery Project of the Year award from the Medicines for Malaria Venture (Switzerland) in 2002, the Australasian Pharmaceutical Sciences Association Medal in 2005, the 2006 Controlled Release Society International Career Achievement in Oral Drug Delivery Award and the 2007 Research Achievement Award from the Pharmaceutical Sciences World Congress.

Charman has been Dean of the Victorian College of Pharmacy at Monash University from 2007 until he stepped down in 2019 Monash University - Dean of the Faculty of Pharmacy and Pharmaceutical Sciences, Professor Bill Charman is stepping down where he holds a personal chair in pharmaceutics and is director of the Centre for Drug Candidate Optimisation. He also works as an adviser to the World Health Organization. He is a regular commentator on many areas of drug development in the Australian media.

References 

Australian pharmacists
Australian medical researchers
Academic staff of Monash University
Living people
Year of birth missing (living people)